Valetoniella is a genus of fungi within the Niessliaceae family. The genus contains three species.

The genus was circumscribed by Franz Xaver Rudolf von Höhnel in Sitzungsber. Kaiserl. Akad. Wiss. Wien, Math.-Nat. Abt. vol.1, 118: 1499 in 1909.

The genus name of Valetoniella is in honour of Theodoric Valeton (1855-1929), who was a Dutch botanist who went to Indonesia.

Species
As accepted by Species Fungorum;
 Valetoniella claviornata 
 Valetoniella crucipila 
 Valetoniella pauciornata

References

External links
Valetoniella at Index Fungorum

Sordariomycetes genera
Niessliaceae